Kasiguncu Airport is an airport in Poso, Indonesia.

Airlines and destinations

References

Airports in Central Sulawesi
Airports established in 1974